Baarish may refer to:

 Baarish (film), a 1957 Bollywood film
 "Baarish" (song), a 2017 Hindi song from the film Half Girlfriend
 Baarish (web series), a 2019 Hindi web series by Ekta Kapoor for OTT platform ALT Balaji

See also
 Barsaat (disambiguation)
 Boarisch, a group of Upper German languages